Gunggari may refer to:
 a variety of the extinct Bidjara language of Australia
Kungkari language, another extinct Australian language

Gungari is a village in the tehsil of Jaisinghpur, Himachal Pradesh, India